The 1942–43 Panhellenic Championship did not occur due to the repetitive disputes in the Greek Football organisation. The 'Union of Greek Athletes' started a League in Athens and Piraeus under the supervision of the German Occupation army. During that period HFF had disbanded so the Union of Greek athletes decided to organize the 1942–43 Panhellenic Championship. The championship started in January 1943 and the games were held at Kaisariani. After short time the championship stopped, because of HFF having been re-established and taken over Greek Football organisation. At that point AEK Athens was leading the championship having won three out of their first four games.

The point system was: Win: 3 points - Draw: 2 points - Loss: 1 point.

|+AEK Athens' matches

|}

HFF and UoGA disagreed on whether the event held so far should be considered as official or not, so the championship restarted. Known results of AEK Athens:

|+AEK Athens' matches

|}

The championship was abandoned once more, due to disagreement between the HFF and the UoGA. At that time AEK Athens was leading the league with a record of:

References

External links
Rsssf, 1942-43 championship

1942–43 in Greek football
Panhellenic Championship seasons
Greece
Athens in World War II